Gaius Lutatius Catulus (242–241 BC) was a Roman statesman and naval commander in the First Punic War.

Catulus may also refer to:

People
 Quintus Lutatius Catulus (consul 102 BC) (149–87 BC), consul of the Roman Republic in 102 BC
 Quintus Lutatius Catulus Capitolinus (c. 121–61 BC), politician in the late Roman Republic

Animals
 Elysia catulus, a species of sea slug in the family Plakobranchidae
 Gracilentulus catulus, a species of proturan in the family Acerentomidae
 Megachile catulus, a species of bee in the family Megachilidae
 Stichopogon catulus, a species of robber flies in the family Asilidae
 Temnosternus catulus, a species of beetle in the family Cerambycidae

Other uses
 Catulus (fungus), a genus of fungus in the class Dothideomycetes